Paracapperia anatolicus is a moth of the family Pterophoridae described by Aristide Caradja in 1920. It is found in Greece, Asia Minor and Syria. There are also records from Spain and Romania, but these seem doubtful.

References

Moths described in 1920
Oxyptilini
Moths of Europe
Moths of Asia
Taxa named by Aristide Caradja